Spring Hollow Creek is a stream in Dallas and Laclede counties in the U.S. state of Missouri. It is a tributary of the Niangua River.

The stream headwaters arise in Laclede County just north of the Burlington Northern Railroad and Interstate 44 about 2.5 miles northeast of Phillipsburg. The stream flows northwest
passing under Missouri Route 32 to enter Bennett Spring State Park where it gathers the waters of Bennett Spring, and enters the Niangua River.

Spring Hollow Creek was named for the surrounding valley where springs occur.

See also
List of rivers of Missouri

References

Rivers of Dallas County, Missouri
Rivers of Laclede County, Missouri
Rivers of Missouri